Shaky Hands may refer to:
 The Shaky Hands, a Portland, Oregon-based rock group
 Tremor of the hands or limbs